The Cornish language revival is an ongoing process to revive the use of the Cornish language of Cornwall, England. The Cornish language's disappearance began to hasten during the 13th century, but its decline began with the spread of Anglo-Saxon in the 4th and 5th centuries. The last reported person to have full knowledge of a traditional form of Cornish, John Davey, died in 1891. The revival movement started in the late 19th century as a result of antiquarian and academic interest in the language, which was already extinct, and also as a result of the Celtic revival movement. In 2009, UNESCO changed its classification of Cornish from "extinct" to "critically endangered", seen as a milestone for the revival of the language.

Revival 

During the 19th century the Cornish language was the subject of antiquarian interest and a number of lectures were given on the subject and pamphlets on it were published. In 1904, the Celtic language scholar and Cornish cultural activist Henry Jenner published A Handbook of the Cornish Language. The publication of this book is often considered to be the start of the current revival movement. The spelling in this book was based on that used when Cornish was last a community language in the 18th century.

Unified Cornish 

The first project to codify Cornish spelling and provide a regular orthography for the revived language was that of Robert Morton Nance who outlined his work in Cornish for All in 1929. Unlike the Late Cornish-based work of Jenner, Nance's orthography, called Unified Cornish, was based mainly on the Middle Cornish of the 14th and 15th centuries. Nance believed that this period represented a high point for Cornish literature. As well as presenting a standardised spelling system, Nance also extended the attested vocabulary with forms based largely on Breton and Welsh, and published a dictionary of Unified Cornish in 1938. Nance's purist approach favoured older 'Celtic' forms rather than the historically more recent forms deriving from Middle and Early Modern English.

Nance's work became the basis of revived Cornish and his orthography was the only one in use for most of the 20th century. However, as the focus shifted from written to spoken Cornish, Nance's stiff, archaic formulation of the language seemed less suitable for a spoken revival. Also, Nance's phonology lacked some distinctions which later research showed must have existed in traditional Cornish. Unified Cornish is still in use by some speakers who, while acknowledging its shortcomings, feel it has served well for the first decades of the revival.

In 1986, in response to dissatisfaction with Unified Cornish, Ken George undertook a study of the sounds of Cornish and devised a new orthography,  or Common Cornish, based on his research. Like Unified Cornish, Kernewek Kemmyn retained a Middle Cornish base but implemented an orthography that aspired to be as phonemic as possible. George argued that this much closer relationship between sounds and writing would make Cornish much easier to teach and learn.

In 1987, after one year of discussion, the Cornish Language Board agreed to adopt it. Its adoption by the Cornish Language Board caused a division in the Cornish language community, especially since people had been using Nance's old system for many years and were unfamiliar with the new one. While it was adopted by a majority of Cornish speakers (various estimates put it at around 55–80%), it was criticised by Nicholas Williams and Jon Mills for various reasons, as well as those who found its novel orthography too different from traditional Cornish spelling conventions.

Unified Cornish Revised 
As an alternative, Williams devised and proposed a revision of Unified Cornish, called Unified Cornish Revised (or UCR). UCR built on Unified Cornish, making the spellings regular while keeping as close as possible to the orthographic practices of the medieval scribes. A comprehensive English-Cornish dictionary of Unified Cornish Revised was published in 2000 and sold enough copies to merit a second edition. A response to the criticisms in Cornish Today appeared soon after in  – Cornish for the Twenty First Century by Ken George and Paul Dunbar. A counter-reply to the latter appeared in 2007.

Modern Cornish 

In the early 1980s, Richard Gendall, who had worked with Nance, published a new system based on the works of the later Cornish writers of the 17th and 18th centuries, just before the language died out. This variety, called Modern Cornish, also known as Late Cornish, uses later, somewhat simpler grammatical constructions and a vocabulary and spelling that was more influenced by English. The orthography has undergone a number of changes. The main body promoting Modern Cornish is Cussel an Tavas Kernuak.

Cornish Language Partnership

In practice these different written forms did not prevent Cornish speakers from communicating with each other effectively. However, the existence of multiple orthographies was unsustainable with regards to using the language in education and public life, as no single orthography had ever achieved a wide consensus. Following the recognition in 2002 of Cornish under Part II of the European Charter for Regional or Minority Languages, and the subsequent establishment of the Cornish Language Partnership, the need for consensus became more urgent. In response to this, the Partnership initiated a process to agree on a standard form for use in education and public life.

In 2007 an independent Cornish Language Commission consisting of sociolinguists and linguists from outside of Cornwall was formed to review the four existing forms (Unified, UCR, Late Cornish and Kemmyn) and consider whether any of these existing orthographies might be suitable for adoption as a standard form of Cornish, or whether a new fifth form should be adopted. Two groups made proposals of compromise orthographies:
 The UdnFormScrefys (Single Written Form) Group developed and proposed an orthography, Kernowak Standard, based on traditional orthographic forms and having a clear relation between spelling and pronunciation, taking both Middle Cornish and Late Cornish dialects of Revived Cornish into account. Since the publication of the Standard Written Form, Kernowak Standard has evolved to become a set of proposed amendments to the SWF.
 Two members of the CLP's Linguistic Working Group, Albert Bock and Benjamin Bruch, proposed another orthography called Kernowek Dasunys (Cornish Re-unified) which endeavoured to reconcile UC, KK, RLC, and UCR orthographies. This proposal was used as a source of input for the SWF but is not being used as a separate orthography.
 Members of a group called Kaskyrgh Kernewek Kemmyn (Campaign for Kernewek Kemmyn) did not agree with the creation of a new standard, and argued that the existing Kernewek Kemmyn orthography should become the standard.

The SWF process eventually decided that the existing orthographies were too contentious to be considered and that a new compromise orthography that all groups could support was needed.

Standard Written Form 

On 9 May 2008, the Cornish Language Partnership met with the specification for the Standard Written Form as the main item on the agenda. All four Cornish language groups, Unified Cornish, Unified Cornish Revised, Kernewek Kemmyn and Modern Cornish were represented at this meeting. Reactions to the proposed orthography were mixed from the various language groups, Kowethas an Yeth Kernewek, Cussel an Tavaz Kernûak, Kesva an Taves Kernewek and Agan Tavas, but the majority wanted resolution and acceptance. The Cornish Language Partnership said that it would 'create an opportunity to break down barriers and the agreement marked a significant stepping stone in the Cornish language'.

The vote to ratify the SWF was carried and on 19 May 2008 it was announced that the orthography had been agreed on. Eric Brooke, chairman of the Cornish Language Partnership, said: "This marks a significant stepping-stone in the development of the Cornish language. In time this step will allow the Cornish language to move forward to become part of the lives of all in Cornwall." The fourth and final Standard Written Form draft was generated on 30 May 2008.

On 17 June 2009, the bards of the Gorseth Kernow, under the leadership of Grand Bard Vanessa Beeman adopted, by overwhelming majority and after two decades of debate, the SWF for their ceremonies and correspondence. From the earliest days under Grand Bards Henry Jenner and Morton Nance, Unified Cornish had been used for the Gorseth ceremony.

Kernowek Standard 

Kernowek Standard (Standard Cornish) is a proposed set of revisions to the SWF. It is based on the initial proposal (called Kernowak Standard and now designated KS1) for the SWF, developed by a group called UdnFormScrefys. After the publication of the SWF specification, members of this group established a new group, Spellyans, to identify shortcomings in the SWF and propose solutions for consideration for the SWF review which took place in 2013. The orthography resulting from the application of these revisions, Kernowek Standard, has been used in a number of books, including an edition of the Bible and a comprehensive grammar, Desky Kernowek.

Comparison tables 
This table compares the spelling of some Cornish words in different orthographies (Unified Cornish, Unified Cornish Revised, Kernewek Kemmyn, Revived Late Cornish, the Standard Written Form, and Kernowek Standard).

See also 
 List of revived languages
 Livonian language revival
 Māori language revival

References 

 
Celtic language revival
Language revival